The 1880–81 season was the third season in the history of West Bromwich Albion Football Club. During the season, Albion played their home matches at Cooper's Hill and Dartmouth Park and were captained by Jimmy Stanton.

Matches

Though yet to start playing competitive football, West Bromwich Albion did take part in a number of friendly matches throughout the season. On 29 January 1881, Billy Bisseker scored three times in the 5–0 win against Hockley Belmont; this was the first recorded hat-trick by an Albion player. The record of the club's matches during their early years is not complete, for example the score from the match against West Bromwich Royal was not recorded.

Source for match details:

See also
1880–81 in English football

Footnotes

References 
Citations

Sources

West Bromwich Albion F.C. seasons
West Bromwich Albion